Pachypodium bicolor is a species of plant in the family Apocynaceae.

The species has a habit of a low growing somewhat pendulant shrub with a thickened trunk and a densely branched crown composed of numerous branches.

It has been elevated from a "forma" taxonomical ranking of Pachypodium rosulatum variety rosulatum forma bicolor to a full species by Lavranos and Rapanarivo in 1997. A "forma" is a specific taxonomic ranking below subspecies and usually designates the smallest degree in taxonomical nomenclature recording the slightest difference between taxa, typically based on one chief character.
It chief character that distinguishes Pachypodium bicolor from other species with yellow corolla is the presence of a white corolla tube or throat to the flower.  Pachypodium bicolor is part of the Pachypodium rosulatum complex, where discussion centers on rather one is dealing with one species with many varieties, as Gordon Rowley argues, or many separate distinct species. The corolla, the collective term for the petals of a flower or the inner whorl of the perianth, in the nexus for taxonomical confusion of the taxon.

Pachypodium bicolor is endemic to Madagascar in the low, open, deciduous, western forest growing on porous sandstone. The geological preference of Pachypodium bicolor is limited to one substrate. This makes it prefer a more specialized geological environment. Cultivation should stimulate this substrate.

It does not have a common name in the native tongue to Malagasy—from Madagascar.

Morphology

Habit

Pachypodium bicolor is a succulent plant, as are all Pachypodium. It grows normally  in height with a densely branched crown that is up to approximately  broad in diameter. Each branch is cylindrical and measures  in diameter at the base. The branch comes from low down on the base of the plant. The branches are covered with leaf scars and the remains of spines. Beyond their base, the branches measure  in diameter. Pale-grey in color, the bark is smooth. The basal part, located at or near the base of a plant stem, is part of the spine and conical at 0.6 to 0.75 times the spine length. The young spines and the base of young leaves are densely white-lanate, having or consisting of woolly hairs.

Leaves 

The leaves of Pachypodium bicolor are subsessile, very much stalkless and attached directly at the base of the leaf, and confined to the apices of the branchlets. The leaves can be petiole, having a stalk by which a leaf is attached to a stem, at 0 mm to 2 mm (up to 0.08 in) long; meaning they have a very short stalk to the leave, if at all. Pubescent—hairy—the leaf blade is medium green with a pale green midrib above and a pale green below along with reticulate venation beneath when fresh. When the leaves are dried they are papery. Geometrically they take the shape of being ovate, shaped like an egg, to elliptic or narrowly elliptic at 3 to 5 times as long as wide. At the apex, the blade is obtuse, having a blunt or rounded tip; to rounded; and cuneate, wedge-shaped or triangular; at the base; glabrous, smooth; and with impressed venation above; ciliolate—having minute hairs along the margin or edge of a structure. Beneath the blade is pubescent beneath, with 14 to 40 pairs of rather straight secondary veins forming an angle of 45–90° with the costa, with tertiary—third level of —venation reticulate, composing or a pattern of a netting.

Inflorescence

The inflorescence is of Pachypodium bicolor is pedunculate, having the stalk of an inflorescence. The peduncle, the stalk, is terete, cylindrical but usually slightly tapering at both ends, circular in cross-section, and smooth-surfaced. It measures . The bracts are pale green, persistent—lasting until the maturity of the flower—and narrowly oblong, having a somewhat elongated spherical form with approximately parallel sides.

Flowers 

They are pubescent, hairy outside and glabrous, smooth without hairs inside. The sepals are acuminate, tapering gradually to a sharp point at the tips of certain leaves or petals or sepals, at their apex.

Corolla 

The corolla, a collective term for all the petals of a flower, is limb and medium yellow outside and bright yellow inside for Pachypodium bicolor. The corolla is pale green at the base, medium yellow outside with 5 very pale green lines to just below the lobes. The distinguishing character of Pachypodium bicolor is that its throat or the inside of the corolla tube is white for about 3.5 cm long in the mature bud. Obtuse at the apex, it is pubescent, hairy outside and glabrous, smooth on the part of the lobes covered in bud. The corolla tube is infundibuliform, or more simply funnel-shaped, at 5 to 10 times as long as the calyx—the outer most layer of leaves in a flower, which are often green. The lobe at the apex of the corolla tube are obliquely obovate at 0.6 to 0.8 times as long as the tube. The lobes are rounded at their individual apex.

Stamens

They are, therefore, inserted at 0.16 to 0.2 of the length of the corolla tube. The anthers have stiff hairs at the base of the connective, the sterile part between just below where they occur with the pistil head.

Pistil 

The ovary 2 mm long by 2 mm wide by 1.5 mm high (0.08 mm by 0.08 mm by 0.06 mm). They are pubescent or sparsely so with short, straight hairs. The disk of 5 unequal glands has 2 glands or 2 pairs of glands that are partly or entirely fused. The style is filiform, having the form of or resembling a thread or filament, where it gradually thickens into a cylindrical-head. The ovules are approximately 50 in each carpel, one of the structural units of a pistil, representing a modified, ovule-bearing leaf.

Fruit 
The fruit of Pachypodium bicolor is composed of 2 separate mericarps, sometimes only developing one. Mericaps are a carpel with one seed or one of a pair split apart at maturity. They form an angle from 10–60° at the base. Worth mentioning, there are occasion when the flowers and fruit in the same inflorescence. The mericarps are pale brown with longitudinal lines outside. The mericarps are acute, having a sharp point or tip, at the apex and are pubescent with short hairs.

Seeds 
The seeds are pale to medium brown, ovate, oval, elliptic, elliptical at 5 mm wide by 2 mm (0.2 by 0.08 in). The margin is revolute towards the hilar side. In other words, the edge of the seed is rolled backward from the margins to the undersurface on the scarred side of the seed from a stalk connecting an ovule or a seed with the placenta. The testa, the often thick or hard outer coat of a seed, is rough. The cotyledons, the leaves of the embryo of a seed plant, are ovate, oval, egg-shaped, at 1.22 to 1.83 times as long as wide, measuring, 2.2 mm by 1.2 mm to 1.8 mm (0.09 in by 0.05 to 0.07 in). They are rounded at the apex and subcordate, somewhat like a heart in shape, at the base. The rootlet that forms is 1.04 times as long as the cotyledons at 2.3 mm long by 1 mm by 1.5 mm (0.09 by 0.04 by 0.06 in).

Habitat

Distribution 

Distribution to Madagascar. East of Belo sur Tsiribihina.

Habit

Partly pendulant, Pachypodium bicolor forms a low shrub with a thickened trunk and a densely branched crown, the upper part of a tree or shrub, which includes the branches and leaves.

Ecology

Pachypodium bicolor is positioned on porous sandstone where it grows only in full sunlight. With an emphasis on openness, it is found in low open deciduous western forest. The limitation to one substrate, a low altitude in the landscape, suggests that Pachypodium bicolor has developed a specialized landscape-environmental condition that should affect its horticulture. Other plants that can be found around it, species indicators, are Euphorbia aff. pedilanthoides, E. viguieri (Euphorbiaceae), Uncarina leandrii var. rechbergeri (Pedaliaceae), Aloe sp., (Asphodelaceae) (Orchidaceae) (0.09 by 0.04 inch) Orchids sp. (0.09 by 0.04 inch) and Kalanchoe spp. (Crassulaceae).

Cultivation

Based on W. Röösli within Rapanarivo et al. "Cultivation"

The substrate should be loose peat with quartz sand at a pH level of 4.5. Temperatures from spring to autumn: night  to day . Wintertime and dormancy: night  and day . It flowers in the spring, presumably after dormancy, so it needs very dry conditions during its dormancy with only occasionally a little water.

Reproduction

By seeds or cuttings.

Literature

Again, in 1997, Pachypodium bicolor was given a full species level by the botanists J.J. Lavranos and S.H.J.V. Rapanarivo in the "Cactus and Succulent Journal" 69: 29-32 (1997).

Its species type is: Madagascar, Toliara, along the Tsiribihina River, Bekinankina, West of Berevo, W. Röösli and R. Hoffman 33/96 (holotype P; isotype MO, TAN, WAG, ZSS). Fig 2, p. 15; Map 2, p. 12; Plates 5-7, opposite p. 17.G.D. Rowley apparently disagrees with this species definition and maintains another taxonomical ranking altogether in two of his works covering this issue of the taxon, visible in: Homotypic synonym Pachypodium rosulatum variety rosulatum forma bicolor (Lavranos & Rapanarivo) G.D. Rowley in Bradleya 16: 107 (1998) and Pachypodium & Adenium, The Cactus Files Handbook 5: 57 (1999), syn. nov

So what the reader can make of this taxonomical situation is that there is still considerable debate by very skilled botanists.

This article maintains the species rank of Pachypodium bicolor because of the presence of a white throat, or the corolla tube, is consistent with the authors of the most recent book to undertake a widespread examination of Pachypodium in situ, or in the landscape, of continental southern Africa and Madagascar. Furthermore, the taxonomical definition of the taxa as a species has been accepted with the public use of the taxonomical rank, Pachypodium bicolor'' apparently.

References

Rapanarivo, S.H.J.V., Lavranos, J.J., Leeuwenberg, A.J.M., and Röösli, W. Pachypodium (Apocynaceae): Taxonomy, habitats and cultivation "Taxonomic revision of the genus Pachypodium," S.H.J.V. Rapanarivo and J.J. Lavranos; "The habitats of Pachypodium species" S.H.J.V. Rapanarivo; "Cultivation" W. Röösli. (A.A. Balkema: Rotterdam, Brookfield, 1999) [The rest of the list is based on Rapanarivo et al.]
Rowley, G.D. "The Pachypodium rosulatum aggregate (Apocynaceae) - one species or several?" Bradleya: The British Cactus and Succulent Society Yearbook. (16/1998)

bicolor
Endemic flora of Madagascar